is a 2011 Japanese anime television series produced by Production I.G which aired on Fuji TV's noitamina program block from October 13, 2011. The story revolves around Shu Ouma, a high school boy who comes into possession of an ability called the "Power of the King" allowing him to draw out items called "Voids" from other people. He is then thrown into the conflict between a quasi-governmental organization known as GHQ and a rebel organization called Funeral Parlor which aims to restore Japan's independence from the GHQ. In the process, Shu has to deal with the burden his ability puts on his shoulders and the horrific mystery of his past.

Two manga adaptations were published, one each by ASCII Media Works and Square Enix. A light novel was published by Nitroplus in April 2012, titled Guilty Crown: Princess of Deadpool. A spin-off visual novel for Windows, named Guilty Crown: Lost Christmas, was also developed by Nitroplus, which came bundled with a 15-minute original video animation (OVA), also titled Guilty Crown: Lost Christmas.

Synopsis

Setting
Before the events of the main story, on December 24, 2029, a biological hazard known as the Apocalypse Virus brought on by an impact event plunges Japan into a state of chaos. This event is later named the Lost Christmas incident. Unable to contain the threat, Japan sought international help and the United Nations dispatches an organization known as the GHQ to their aid. The GHQ successfully contains the outbreak and restores a level of normality at the cost of Japan's independence. Ten years later, a resistance organization known as the Funeral Parlor wages a campaign against the GHQ to liberate Japan once more.

Plot
In the Roppongi district of Tokyo, high school student Shu Ouma encounters a wounded girl named Inori Yuzuriha, the vocalist of a popular internet group Egoist, taking refuge at his film club's workshop. The GHQ Anti Bodies storm the workshop and arrest her for involvement with Funeral Parlor. Shu follows the coordinates of Inori's robot to a drop zone where he meets Funeral Parlor's leader, Gai Tsutsugami, who asks him to safeguard a vial. As the Anti-Bodies begin attacking the Roppongi area looking for the vial, it shatters as Shu goes to rescue Inori when she becomes threatened by GHQ Endlave mechs. The vial contains the Void Genome, a powerful genetic weapon derived from the Apocalypse Virus that grants Shu the "Power of the King", an ability that allows his right hand to extract Voids, weapons of people's psyche given physical form. Shu then extracts Inori's Void and destroys the attacking Endlaves.

Upon deciding to join Funeral Parlor, Shu begins to fall in love with Inori, who bears a striking resemblance to his late sister, Mana. However, he deserts the group after causing the death of a classmate's younger brother during one of his missions. In Shu's absence, Funeral Parlor attempt to steal from GHQ the meteorite that originally caused the Apocalypse Virus outbreak. In the process, Gai and his forces fall into a trap as the Anti-Bodies decimate their ranks with a "genetic resonance" broadcast that unleashes the Virus throughout Tokyo. Amidst the chaos, the Anti-Bodies' leader, Shūichirō Keido, seizes control of the GHQ and directs his attention towards wiping out the remains of Funeral Parlor.

After learning his former comrades are in imminent danger of annihilation, Shu races to the center of Tokyo to rescue them. With the help of his classmates, he breaks through the barricade where they are being pinned down. Meanwhile, Inori begins to reverse the effects of the outbreak through a resonance broadcast channeled by one of her songs. This sudden change in fortune proves only temporary when Yu, a mysterious boy possessing the "Power of the King", appears out of thin air and kidnaps Inori, causing the outbreak to resume with full force.

Shu finds Inori being held captive by Keido, who is using her as part of a "marriage ceremony" to resurrect Mana. Keido explains Inori was created to provide a physical body for Mana's soul so she could give birth to a new human race once the present population was destroyed by the Apocalypse Virus. Shu's repressed memories suddenly return, causing him to remember how Mana was the first to be infected by the virus, and her mental breakdown resulted in the events of Lost Christmas. Shu also recalls from his past that Gai is none other than Triton, a childhood friend he first met ten years ago when Mana rescued him from the sea. With Gai's help, Shu frees Inori from Keido's grasp before stabbing Mana's stasis pod. Shu's actions save the world from the Virus, but Gai is killed in the process.

Two weeks later, the GHQ under Keido's leadership seals off the area surrounding Roppongi, now called Loop 7, before proceeding to systematically eliminate the inhabitants within. A large number of teenagers take refuge at Tennouzu High School along with Funeral Parlor members Shu, Inori, Ayase and Tsugumi. With food and vaccine supplies running low, Shu is elected the new student council president. Despite initially aspiring to provide just governance to those under his charge, his leadership grows increasingly despotic and cynical after his initial refusal to adopt the exclusionary Voids-Ranking system leads to the death of his close friend and love interest, Hare Menjou.

Shu and the others eventually break out of Loop 7. However, upon their escape, a resurrected Gai suddenly appears and severs Shu's right arm before transferring the Void Genome to himself. In order to insure Shu's escape, Inori single-handedly holds off GHQ until their forces overwhelm her. Shortly thereafter, Shu's stepmother, Haruka Ohma, betrays the GHQ and steals the third Void Genome. Shu ultimately injects himself with it before assuming command of Funeral Parlor to rescue Inori and free Japan once and for all.

After Gai broadcasts a message to the world not to interfere with GHQ's actions in Japan, he joins Yu and Keido in preparing Mana's resurrection in Inori's body. It is revealed that GHQ is merely serving as a front for Da'ath, an ancient cult seeking to forcefully bring about mankind's evolution with the Apocalypse Virus. As the virus begins spreading across the planet from Tokyo Tower, Funeral Parlor and its allies mount a massive offensive against Tokyo Bay to save the world.

In the series' climactic final battle, Shu manages to defeat Yu and Gai while Funeral Parlor destroys GHQ's forces. Seeing his plans ruined beyond repair, Keido commits suicide by injecting himself with the virus. A dying Gai explains to Shu that he helped Da'ath so Mana could fulfill her cursed role as the Fourth Apocalypse's Eve. With her role completed, he says that Mana is finally able to rest in peace. Gai also admits that he is fully aware his actions were also wrong, and that being hated by his comrades and Shu wanting to kill him makes it fair and square. He chooses to die with Mana as the Virus envelops them both. Upon coming across a heavily infected Inori, Shu embraces her and activates his Void to absorb all traces of the Apocalypse Virus into himself. Before he is consumed, Inori saves Shu by sacrificing her body to destroy the virus permanently. With the virus finally eradicated, the GHQ Tower collapses and everyone escapes. Some years later, Ayase, Tsugumi, Yahiro, Kanon, Souta and a now blind Shu celebrate Hare's birthday in a rebuilt Tokyo.

Production
In the making of the series, the staff wanted to make "the next generation of anime with this show." For this they wanted it to be an original anime rather than an adaptation. The staff also wanted it to be a "two-season show" regardless of possible difficulties. The basic concept of the show is in a "Japanese style, a Japanese concept, and that is what makes it more original than other shows." When asked about similarities between Shu and Neon Genesis Evangelions lead Shinji Ikari, the staff answered they are both passive characters although they found Shinji more passive.

When asked what circumstances led to his involvement, Redjuice responded that the production staff's illustrators and animators felt that his concept art exhibited a sense of compatibility with the final product. While Ryo of Supercell was providing the insert songs for the show, Redjuice himself was not participating in the project as a member of Supercell. Besides liking Inori, the main heroine of Guilty Crown, Redjuice stated that he had done many drawings of Tsugumi. The staff had no qualms with the catlike ears of Tsugumi so Redjuice feels that he has slipped his personal tastes into the series. Redjuice also likes Kanon although she was not originally written into the scenario. As Redjuice has not worked with 3D CG much, he was able to learn a lot from the staff at Production I.G.

Music

The music used in the Guilty Crown anime is composed by Hiroyuki Sawano. Both the opening and ending themes of Guilty Crown are written by Supercell. The first opening theme is titled "My Dearest" and is performed by Koeda. The CD single for "My Dearest" was released on November 23, 2011. The first ending theme is titled  and is performed by Egoist, a fictional band from the series. The single for "Departures (Anata ni Okuru Ai no Uta)" was released on November 30, 2011. A 17-year-old artist named Chelly provided the vocals. Chelly was picked by Ryo of Supercell after an audition of 2,000 candidates. Chelly also sang the insert songs in Guilty Crown.

Release

Guilty Crown was directed by Tetsuro Araki with the series' script supervision being handled by Hiroyuki Yoshino and assisted by Ichirō Ōkouchi. Jin Hanegaya from Nitroplus will also be assisting with the screenplay. The mechanical designs were done by Atsushi Takeuchi and prop designs handled by Yō Moriyama. The original character designs were drawn by Redjuice, with Hiromi Katō providing the character designs for the anime. Yusuke Takeda was the anime's art director. The animation production was done by Production I.G's Division 6.

An Internet radio show named Guilty Crown Radio Council to promote Guilty Crown began airing every other Friday starting on October 7, 2011. The show is hosted by Yūki Kaji, the voice actor of Shu Ouma, and Ai Kayano, the voice actress of Inori Yuzuriha.

New York Anime Festival screened the first two episodes of Guilty Crown on October 15, 2011. The screening of the second episode was a world premiere as the episode did not air in Japan until October 20, 2011. At Anime Weekend Atlanta 2011, Funimation announced that it would simulcast the series in October, followed by a DVD and Blu-ray release in 2012. Guilty Crown was later available on Netflix.

Related media

Print
A manga adaptation titled Guilty Crown, written by Yōsuke Miyagi and illustrated by Shion Mizuki, was serialized in Square Enix's Monthly Shōnen Gangan between the November 2011 and December 2013 issues. Square Enix released seven tankōbon volumes between January 21, 2012, and December 21, 2013. The manga adpatation is based first half anime with second half anime both some elements and storylines. A second manga titled Guilty Crown: Dancing Endlaves, written by Gan Sunaaku and illustrated by Ryōsuke Fukai, was serialized in ASCII Media Works' Dengeki G's Magazine between the July 2012 and May 2014 issues. Three volumes were released between January 26, 2013, and May 27, 2014.

A side story novel titled Guilty Crown: Princess of Deadpool was written by Gan Sunaaku from Nitroplus, with illustrations done by a Production I.G and Nitroplus collaboration. A special version that came along with a special book cover was first sold at Anime Contents Expo 2012 in between March 31 and April 1, while the official release was on April 25. The first chapter was put up for public reading.

Visual novel
Nitroplus developed a spin-off visual novel for Windows, named . The visual novel was previously known as Lost X. The scenario writer for this game is Jin Hanegaya, who also penned Demonbane. The game focuses on the "Lost Christmas" incident. The full version of the game includes a short 10-minute anime.

Reception
The series received mixed critical reaction. Carl Kimlinger from Anime News Network commended the series' bravery on reinventing its plot but described the plot as jumbled and continued the trend of weak characters and clichés. Aiden Foote of THEM Anime Reviews agreed with Kimlinger on the presentation and plot and added that the characters are unsympathetic with back stories that do not add depth to them. On the other hand, Foote remarks the aesthetics and the musical appeal, stating that "Guilty Crown is its own jewel in terms of music, visual flare and design from the characters to the setting, to the set pieces." Chris Beveridge from The Fandom Post commented "While it goes big and throws a lot at us, the end result that defines the rest of the season is one that works fantastically well for me because it introduces radical change into the series." He praised Shu's character development as well as the setting chosen for its second half.

DVD Talk's Kyle Mills gave the series more praise, noting that despite small criticism "the 1st 11 episodes of the series are great." He praised the story and setting but criticized the development of certain characters comparing them to "flaws" Gurren Lagann made. UK Anime Network commented on the series' second half that the series "bites off more than it can chew, and at times the fervent mastication that comes from this leaves certain aspects of its narrative as something of a sloppy mess, but there's still an interesting story being told here and much of it is delivered in an enjoyable fashion thanks to a superb soundtrack, slick action set pieces, and some strong ideas that make good use of the show's cast of characters." Despite criticism, Andy Hanley of UK Anime Network praised the animation as "visually eye-catching."

References

External links
  
 Visual novel official website 
 Side story novel official website 
 

2011 Japanese television series debuts
2011 anime television series debuts
2011 manga
2012 Japanese novels
ASCII Media Works manga
Action anime and manga
Anime composed by Hiroyuki Sawano
Anime with original screenplays
Aniplex franchises
Bandai Namco franchises
Dengeki G's Magazine
Dystopian anime and manga
Experimental medical treatments in fiction
Fiction about corporate warfare
Fiction about diseases and disorders
Fiction about government
Fiction about meteoroids
Fiction about rebellions
Fiction set in 2029
Fiction set in 2039
Fiction set in 2040
Films with screenplays by Ichirō Ōkouchi
Funimation
Gangan Comics manga
Genetic engineering in fiction
IG Port franchises
Mass media franchises
Mecha anime and manga
Military anime and manga
Nitroplus
Noitamina
Political thriller anime and manga
Post-apocalyptic anime and manga
Production I.G
Propaganda in fiction
Science fiction anime and manga
Science fantasy anime and manga
Square Enix franchises
Television series set in the future
Television shows set in Asia
Television shows set in Japan
Television shows set in Tokyo
Television series set in 2029
Television series set in the 2030s
Television series set in the 2040s
Terrorism in fiction
Visual novels
Television series about World War III
Video games developed in Japan
War in anime and manga